The Local Government Pension Scheme (LGPS) is one of the largest public sector pension schemes in the United Kingdom, with 4.6 million members. Administration is carried out through 99 regional pension funds such as Greater Manchester Pension Fund and West Midlands Pension Fund.

In 2014 the LGPS changed from a final salary scheme to a career average scheme.

In 2015, the UK government began the process of LGPS pension pooling, whereby individual LGPS funds across England and Wales were gathered into larger pools, in order to reduce costs and target infrastructure investment, among other priorities; priorities were laid out by the Ministry of Housing, Communities and Local Government. Eight different pension pools were created and began to transition assets, developing at very different speeds.

In the 2022 Levelling Up White Paper, the government set out targets for LGPS pension pots to invest at least 5% of their assets in projects that support local areas, potentially unlocking £16bn of LGPS capital for investments in local projects

References

Public pension funds in the United Kingdom